Edward Banbury (1817 – 8 April 1871) was an English cricketer. He was born at Warley, Essex.

Banbury made a single appearance in first-class cricket for the Marylebone Cricket Club against the Surrey Club at The Oval in 1846. In a match which Marylebone Cricket Club won by 48 runs, Banbury scored 4 runs in their first-innings before he was dismissed by William Martingell, while in their second-innings he was dismissed for a duck by Bill Brockwell.

He died at Tring Park, Hertfordshire on 8 April 1871.

References

External links
 

1817 births
1871 deaths
People from Brentwood, Essex
English cricketers
Marylebone Cricket Club cricketers